Epsomantis is a monotypic genus of mantis in the new (2019) family Nanomantidae. It represented by the single species, Epsomantis tortricoides.

Range
North Borneo, Java.

See also
List of mantis genera and species

References

Nanomantidae
Mantodea genera
Monotypic insect genera
Mantodea of Asia
Insects of Borneo
Insects of Java
Taxa named by Ermanno Giglio-Tos